The Bembe people (or Babembe in the plural) are an ethnic group based in the eastern Democratic Republic of the Congo and western Katavi Region of Tanzania. They live mainly in the territory of Fizi in South Kivu. The Bembe are also in the province of Tanganyika in the city of Kalemie. In 1991, the Bembe population of the DRC was estimated to number 252,000 and around 1.5 million in 2005. The Bembe people are a subgroup of The Mongo people.

Cultural traditions
A semi-nomadic people, who often settled in forest environments, the Bembe tended to abandon their small villages as the soil became less fertile. The women cultivated the crops and the men hunted and fished.

See also
 List of ethnic groups in Tanzania

References

External links

Works by Bembe artists at the University of Michigan Museum of Art (Beware, some of the objects could be Beembe of Congo-Brazzaville!)
Bembe art at the University of Iowa Stanley Museum of Art (Beware, some of the objects could be Beembe of Congo-Brazzaville!)
Works by Bembe artists at the Metropolitan Museum of Art (Beware, some of the objects could be Beembe of Congo-Brazzaville!

•  

Ethnic groups in the Democratic Republic of the Congo
Ethnic groups in Tanzania
Indigenous peoples of East Africa